Sir John Andrew Harman DL (born 30 July 1950, Castleford) is a former Chairman of the Environment Agency.

Early life
He attended the independent St George's College, Weybridge. From the University of Manchester he gained a BSc degree in maths, then did a PGCE at Huddersfield College of Education.

Career
He was a maths teacher at Greenhead College in Huddersfield from 1973–9. He was Head of Maths at Barnsley Sixth Form College from 1979–90, then Senior Maths Lecturer at Barnsley College (it took over the sixth form college) from 1990–7.

He became a member of the UK Labour Party from 1977 and was elected to the West Yorkshire Metropolitan Council. After the metropolitan councils were disbanded under Margaret Thatcher, he was elected to, and led, Kirklees Council from 1986–99, during which he was Councillor for the Paddock ward of Huddersfield. At the 1987 General Election, he was the parliamentary candidate for Colne Valley, west of Huddersfield, coming second to Graham Riddick of the Conservatives.

In 2000, he became Chairman of the Environment Agency, and left in 2008.

Recognition
He received a knighthood in 1997 for services to local government and the environment. Sir John is also a fellow of the Royal Society of Arts and an honorary fellow of the Institution of Civil Engineers.

Personal life
He married Susan Crowther in 1971. They have one son and three daughters.

External links
 The Environment Centre
 Energy Saving Trust

News items
 Independent January 2009

1950 births
Living people
Labour Party (UK) councillors
Politicians from Castleford
Alumni of the University of Huddersfield
Alumni of the Victoria University of Manchester
Schoolteachers from Yorkshire
People educated at St George's College, Weybridge
Councillors in Kirklees
Deputy Lieutenants of West Yorkshire
Knights Bachelor
Alumni of the University of Manchester